The RFL Match Officials are a select group of professional Rugby League match officials who officiate the top divisions of Rugby League in Britain.

Officials are required to take part in a Fitness Test to maintain and or gain their status.

Match Official Department Staff

Graded Match Officials 
To become an Elite match official, Grade 1 officials must have an interview with the Head of Match Officials.

Elite Referees (RFL Full Time Match Officials)
Since the 2007 season, the Rugby Football League have employed a panel of full-time officials. That panel currently has eight members.

Current Full Time Match Officials Squad

Previous Full Time Match Officials

Elite Touch Judges (Super League)

Grade 1 Match Officials

Select Referees

Select Touch Judges

Grade 2 Match Officials

Emerging Referees

Emerging Touch Judges

Grade 3 Match Officials

Entry Referees

Entry Touch Judges

Kit suppliers and sponsors

See also

NRL match officials
Super League
Rugby Football League

References

External links

Rugby league in England
Rugby league referees